Gianluca Korte (born 29 August 1990) is a German professional footballer who plays as a midfielder for TSV Steinbach.

Career
Korte was born in Speyer. He joined 2. Bundesliga club Eintracht Braunschweig in 2011 from Oberliga Südwest side TuS Mechtersheim. There he made his professional debut on 12 August 2011, in a 3–1 away win over Karlsruher SC. With Braunschweig, Korte was promoted to the Bundesliga in 2013. He made his debut in the first tier on 30 November 2013 against FC Bayern Munich.

In January 2015, Korte joined VfR Aalen on a six-months loan deal. At the end of the 2014–15 2. Bundesliga season, his contract with Braunschweig was terminated by mutual consent.

After having been without a club for six months, Korte signed with Regionalliga Südwest club SV Waldhof Mannheim on 11 January 2016.

Personal life
Korte is the identical twin brother of Raffael Korte, also a professional footballer.

References

External links

1990 births
Living people
People from Speyer
Footballers from Rhineland-Palatinate
Identical twins
Twin sportspeople
German twins
Association football midfielders
German footballers
Eintracht Braunschweig players
Eintracht Braunschweig II players
VfR Aalen players
SV Waldhof Mannheim players
SV Wehen Wiesbaden players
TSV Steinbach Haiger players
Bundesliga players
2. Bundesliga players
Regionalliga players
3. Liga players